Douglas Raymond "Gaga" Mills (April 9, 1907 – August 12, 1993), a native of Elgin, Illinois, was a high school and college basketball player and coach in the state of Illinois. During high school, Mills was the first player in the state to lead his team to back-to-back titles in 1924 and 1925.  He totaled 32 points in four state tournament games for Elgin High School during an era of low-scoring play.  Mills played for the Illinois Fighting Illini men's basketball team from 1927 to 1930 followed by a five-year coaching stint at Joliet Township High School. He led his Joliet team to the state tournament in 1935.  He returned to the U of I as head men's basketball coach from 1936 to 1947. He coached the famous "Whiz Kids" and also served as the Fighting Illini's athletic director.  Mills died in 1993.

While coaching at Illinois, Mills compiled a record of 151 wins and 66 losses, winning three conference titles during his tenure. He added the athletic director's post in 1941. In 1947, he stepped down as head coach to concentrate on his duties as athletic director, naming Champaign High coach Harry Combes as his successor. He was also responsible for hiring football coaches Ray Eliot and Pete Elliott. In 2007, the Illinois High School Association named Mills one of the 100 Legends of the IHSA Boys Basketball Tournament.

He and his wife, Lorene Muntz, had a daughter, Sally, who died from a ruptured appendix.  The two later adopted two children, Peter G. Mills and the late Molly M. Mills.

Doug and Lorene divorced in the early 1960's.  Neither ever remarried.

Head coaching record

High school

College

References

1907 births
1983 deaths
American football quarterbacks
American men's basketball coaches
American men's basketball players
Basketball coaches from Illinois
Basketball players from Illinois
High school basketball coaches in the United States
Illinois Fighting Illini athletic directors
Illinois Fighting Illini football coaches
Illinois Fighting Illini football players
Illinois Fighting Illini men's basketball coaches
Illinois Fighting Illini men's basketball players
Players of American football from Illinois
Sportspeople from Elgin, Illinois